Brandon Swarzendruber (born April 2, 1985) is an American soccer player.

Career

College and Amateur
Swartzendruber played college soccer at Chandler-Gilbert Community College in Chandler, Arizona before transferring to Midwestern State University in Wichita Falls, Texas prior to his junior year. He earned All-Conference honors in at Midwestern State 2005, and in 2006 was an All-Conference and All-Region pick, a Division II All-American, and the Conference Offensive Player of the Year.

Swartzendruber spent his summers in Canada, where he enjoyed a successful amateur career, playing for Okanagan Challenge in the Pacific Coast Soccer League in 2005, and for Thunder Bay Chill in the USL Premier Development League in 2007 and 2008. Swartzendruber helped Thunder Bay win the 2008 PDL Championship, scoring 13 goals for the team in his final season.

Professional
Swartzendruber turned professional when he signed with Harrisburg City Islanders of the USL Second Division in 2009. He made his professional debut on April 18, 2009 in a 2-2 tie with Richmond Kickers, and scored his first professional goal on April 25, 2009 in a 3-1 win over  the Western Mass Pioneers. He went on to score 4 goals in 18 appearances for Harrisburg—an impressive statistic when only playing 540 minutes all season. Swartzendruber also scored the lone goal for Harrisburg in a 3-1 friendly against Crystal Palace FC from the English Championship.

Swartzendruber returned to play for Thunder Bay Chill in the USL Premier Development League in 2010. He also played for the team in 2015 and 2017.

Honors

Thunder Bay Chill
USL Premier Development League Champions (1): 2008

References

External links
 Harrisburg City Islanders bio

1985 births
Living people
American soccer players
Midwestern State Mustangs men's soccer players
Okanagan Challenge players
Thunder Bay Chill players
Penn FC players
Dayton Dutch Lions players
Phoenix Rising FC players
Soccer players from Colorado
USL League Two players
USL Second Division players
USL Championship players
Association football forwards